Neodymium(III) sulfate is a salt of the rare-earth metal neodymium that has the formula Nd2(SO4)3. It forms multiple hydrates, the octa-, penta-, and the dihydrate, which the octahydrate is the most common. This compound has a retrograde solubility, unlike other compounds, its solubility decreases with increasing temperature. This compound is used in glass for extremely powerful lasers.

Preparation
Neodymium sulfate is produced by dissolving neodymium(III) oxide in sulfuric acid:

It can also be prepared by the reaction of neodymium(III) perchlorate and sodium sulfate.

Properties
Neodymium sulfate octahydrate decomposes at 40 °C to the pentahydrate, which in turn decomposes to the dihydrate at 145 °C. The dihydrate dehydrates to the anhydrous form at 290 °C.

References

Sulfates
Neodymium compounds